The 1933 Providence Friars football team was an American football team that represented Providence College during the 1933 college football season. Led by ninth-year head coach Archie Golembeski, the team compiled a 2–4 record and was outscored by a total of 68 to 63.

Schedule

References

Providence
Providence Friars football seasons
Providence Friars football